Acontista fraterna is a species of mantis in the family Acontistidae.

References

Mantodea
Articles created by Qbugbot
Insects described in 1894